was a town located in Tōhaku District, Tottori Prefecture, Japan.

As of 2003, the town had an estimated population of 6,461 and a density of 137.26 persons per km2. The total area was 47.07 km2.

On October 1, 2004, Tōgō, along with the town of Hawai, and the village of Tomari (all from Tōhaku District), was merged to create the town of Yurihama.

External links
 Yurihama official website 

Dissolved municipalities of Tottori Prefecture
Tōhaku District, Tottori
Yurihama, Tottori